Sungni station is a station on Chŏllima Line of the Pyongyang Metro.

References

External links
 

Railway stations opened in 1973
Pyongyang Metro stations
1973 establishments in North Korea